The Australian Pro was a men's professional tennis tournament held in 1954. It was billed as the Australian Professional Championships. In many later years, separate pro events were held in various Australian state capitals.  From 1957 to 1959 Tournament of Champions events were held in Australia (in 1957 and 1959 in Sydney and 1958 in Melbourne). The Ampol Masters was held in 1958 at White City, Sydney.

Singles finals

Australian Pro

Western Australia Pro

South Australia Pro

See also
Major professional tennis tournaments before the Open Era

References

Sources

 

Sports competitions in Sydney
Defunct tennis tournaments in Australia
Professional tennis tournaments before the Open Era
Recurring sporting events established in 1954
Recurring sporting events disestablished in 1966
1954 establishments in Australia
1966 disestablishments in Australia